UFC 111: St-Pierre vs. Hardy was a mixed martial arts event held by the Ultimate Fighting Championship (UFC) on March 27, 2010 at the Prudential Center in Newark, New Jersey, United States.

Background
The UFC Primetime series returned to build up the UFC Welterweight Championship fight between GSP and Dan Hardy.  It was the first time a British fighter had ever fought for a UFC title.

Martin Kampmann was originally set to fight Ben Saunders, but Kampmann was replaced by Jake Ellenberger, due to a deep cut suffered in training by Kampmann.

Ricardo Funch was forced to pull out of a fight against Matthew Riddle for an undisclosed reason. UFC newcomer Greg Soto was his replacement.

Spike TV broadcast three preliminary bouts one hour before the live PPV broadcast began.

This event was seen in movie theaters throughout the United States via National CineMedia's Fathom event distribution service. Also, it was shown at the Cineplex Odeon chain in Canada.

On March 10, 2010 it was announced that the event was officially sold out.

There was also some controversy that the UFC airbrushed Hardy's tattoo which reads "om mani padme hum" for their promotional poster. UFC president Dana White later admitted that this was done so as to not provoke the Chinese government.

On March 25, 2010 Thiago Alves was removed from the card due to brain irregularity from a pre-fight CAT scan. After learning of the removal, Ben Saunders, who was scheduled to fight Jake Ellenberger, requested Alves's opponent, Jon Fitch, and subsequently replaced Ellenberger on the card. As a result, Ellenberger did not compete but received his "show" and "win" money to make up for the last minute switch. The fight between Kurt Pellegrino and Fabricio Camoes was moved up to the main card as a result of the cancellation.

On March 26 at the official weigh-ins, Rory Markham weighed 177 lb.  He forfeited $1,000 (12.5% of his purse) to Nate Diaz.

Results

Bonus awards
Fighters were awarded $65,000 bonuses:

Fight of the Night: Rodney Wallace vs. Jared Hamman
Knockout of the Night: Shane Carwin
Submission of the Night: Kurt Pellegrino

Television rating
The preliminary bouts shown on Spike TV at 9 pm EST drew a series-low of 1.2 million viewers, and coincided with the Elite Eight round of the NCAA basketball tournament.

References

See also
 Ultimate Fighting Championship
 List of UFC champions
 List of UFC events
 2010 in UFC

Ultimate Fighting Championship events
2010 in mixed martial arts
Mixed martial arts in New Jersey
Sports competitions in Newark, New Jersey
2010 in New Jersey